Marek Krzysztof Witkowski (born 21 May 1974 in Czechowice-Dziedzice) is a Polish sprint canoeist who competed from 1994 to 2000. Competing in two Summer Olympics, he won a bronze medal in the K-4 1000 m event at Sydney in 2000.

For his sport achievements, he received: 
 Golden Cross of Merit in 2000.

Career highlights
Witkowski won a bronze medal at the 2000 Summer Olympics in Sydney in the Men's K-4 1000 m competition with crewmates Adam Seroczyński, Dariusz Białkowski and Grzegorz Kotowicz. He also won three medals at the ICF Canoe Sprint World Championships with a silver (K-4 1000 m: 1994) and two bronzes (K-4 500 m and K-4 1000 m: both 1995).

References
DatabaseOlympics.com profile

Pkol.pl profile 
Sports-reference.com profile

1974 births
Canoeists at the 1996 Summer Olympics
Canoeists at the 2000 Summer Olympics
Living people
Olympic canoeists of Poland
Olympic bronze medalists for Poland
People from Czechowice-Dziedzice
Polish male canoeists
Olympic medalists in canoeing
ICF Canoe Sprint World Championships medalists in kayak
Sportspeople from Silesian Voivodeship
Medalists at the 2000 Summer Olympics